"Don't Lie" is a song recorded by American country music artist Trace Adkins.  It was released in September 1999 as the first single from the album More....  The song reached #27 on the Billboard Hot Country Singles & Tracks chart.  The song was written by Frank Rogers and Chet Biggers.

Chart performance

References

1999 singles
1999 songs
Trace Adkins songs
Songs written by Frank Rogers (record producer)
Song recordings produced by Paul Worley
Capitol Records Nashville singles